Rattana may refer to:

Uses
Amphoe Si Rattana, district, in the central part of Sisaket Province, northeastern Thailand
Norodom Rattana Devi, Cambodian princess and politician
Veth Rattana (born 1986), Cambodian actress whose popularity rose from 2003 to 2007
Piyapan Rattana, Thai futsal player
Woratep Rattana-umpawan, classical guitarist from Thailand
Rattana Pestonji (1908–1970), Thai film director, producer, screenwriter and cinematographer
Rattana Petch-Aporn, Thai football player
Wat Phra Si Rattana Mahathat, Buddhist temple (Wat) in Phitsanulok, Thailand
A tribe in Survivor: Borneo
A genus of Braconid wasps in the subfamily Cenocoeliinae

See also
Rātana
Rattan